Football Club Antibes Juan-les-Pins is a French association football team based in Antibes. The team currently plays at an amateur and regional level but was part of Division 1 for 7 seasons, from its beginning in 1932 to 1939.

Honours
 Played in Division 1: 1932–1939

Landmarks
 1912: Founded as Olympique d'Antibes
 1932: Became a professional club and took part to the first professional football season in France.
 1933: The team was involved in a bribery scandal and renamed Football Club d'Antibes.
 1939: Relegation to Division 2. The club was renamed Olympique d'Antibes Juan-les-Pins.
 1947: Relegation from Division 2 to amateur football.
 1965–66: Merger with 2 clubs: Espérance and US Antiboise. The club assumed its current name.

Managerial history
 Albert James Martin (1928-1929)
 Valère (1932–1933)
Bino Scasa
Jean Lardi (1935–1936)
 Billy Aitken (1937–1939)
 Raoul Chaisaz
 Numa Andoire (1945–1946)
 R. Cardi (1946–1947)
Lecrublier
Bernardi
 Laurent Robuschi (1971–1985)
 Serge Recordier (1993–1995)
 Alain Wathelet (1995–1996)
 Serge Recordier (1996–1998)

References

External links

Official website
Seasons and history summary

Association football clubs established in 1912
FC Antibes
1912 establishments in France
Football clubs in Provence-Alpes-Côte d'Azur
Ligue 1 clubs